Devdas is a 2002 Indian Hindi-language epic romantic drama film directed by Sanjay Leela Bhansali. It stars Shah Rukh Khan, Aishwarya Rai and Madhuri Dixit, while Kirron Kher, Smita Jaykar and Vijayendra Ghatge play supporting roles. The film's story focuses on Devdas (Khan), a Bachelor of Law student who later becomes an alcoholic after his family rejects his relationship with Paro (Rai Bachchan), Devdas' childhood friend. The film was produced by Bharat Shah for his company Mega Bollywood, and its screenplay was written by Bhansali and Prakash Ranjit Kapadia, who also wrote the dialogue. The soundtrack for Devdas was composed by Ismail Darbar and Birju Maharaj, who co-wrote the lyrics with Nusrat Badr and Sameer Anjaan. Binod Pradhan and Bela Sehgal completed the cinematography and editing, respectively, while Nitin Chandrakant Desai handled the production design.

It received mixed reviews from critics, but emerged as the highest-grossing Indian film of the year, earning . The film won 61 awards from 91 nominations; its direction, music, performances of the cast members, screenplay, cinematography, choreography, costumes and production design have received the most attention from award groups.

Devdas received a nomination for the Best Film Not in the English Language from the 56th British Academy Film Awards. At the 50th National Film Awards, it won five trophies, including Best Popular Film Providing Wholesome Entertainment. The film won eleven awards at the 48th Filmfare Awards, including Best Film, Best Director (Bhansali), Best Actor (Khan), Best Actress (Rai Bachchan) and Best Supporting Actress (Dixit). In the fourth iteration of the International Indian Film Academy Awards, the film garnered seventeen nominations, going on to win sixteen categories, including Best Film, Best Director (Bhansali), Best Actor (Khan), Best Actress (Rai Bachchan) and Best Supporting Actress (Kher).

Awards and nominations

See also
 List of Bollywood films of 2002

Notes

References

External links
 Awards and nominations received by Devdas at IMDb

Devdas